Daniel Nestor and Nenad Zimonjić were the defending champions, but they lost to František Čermák and Michal Mertiňák 7–5, 6–2 in the first round.Bob Bryan and Mike Bryan won in the final against Mahesh Bhupathi and Max Mirnyi, 6–3, 6–4.

Seeds

Draw

Finals

Top half

Bottom half

References
Doubles Draw

Masters - Doubles